Kurt D. Squire (born July 10, 1972, in Valparaiso, Indiana) is a professor at The University of California, Irvine, member of the Connected Learning Laboratory, and former director of the Games, Learning & Society Initiative at the University of Wisconsin-Madison, best known for his research into game design for education.

Biography 
Squire was born as the elder of two children to Walter "Dean" Squire, an accountant, and Susan Elizabeth Nelson, a German language teacher.  He attended Portage High School, graduating in 1990, then going on to study at the Western College Program at Miami University.

Squire is married to Constance Steinkuehler, also a video game scholar and professor at the University of California, Irvine.

Education/teaching career
He received a B.Phil in Interdisciplinary Studies in 1994 from Miami University, and earned a Ph.D in education in 2004 from Indiana University. He taught at the Knoxville Montessori School and the McGuffey Foundation School between 1994 and 1996; later he became Research Manager of the Games-to-Teach Project at MIT.

Squire is the recipient of an National Science Foundation (NSF) CAREER grant, as well as grant support from the NSF, National Institutes of Healthy, Department of Education, the MacArthur Foundation, AMD and Gates Foundations, as well as companies such as Microsoft, DeVry, and the Data Recognition Corporation. A big music fan and harmonicaist, he has led many discussions on the drum sound on Jason Isbell's "Be Afraid" and his favorite Daniel Lanois album is Waves of Air. Squire wrote a regular column for Computer Games magazine, and has been interviewed for many periodicals and media outlets, from PBS to wired.com.

References

External links 
 List of publications
 GLS Conference website

1972 births
Living people
American male journalists
Journalists from California
Indiana University alumni
Massachusetts Institute of Technology faculty
Miami University alumni
People from Valparaiso, Indiana
University of California, Irvine faculty
Video game culture